This is a list of major architecture film festivals, sorted by continent.

South America

Africa

Europe

Architecture
Film